The 2009 Queen's Cup was the 33rd edition of this Thai domestic football cup competition.

The last edition was played in 2006 and won by the Rajnavy Rayong FC.

Hanyang University are the most successful club, having won the competition on seven occasions.

Rules
20 teams have been divided into 5 groups.
All groups have a host team where the group games will be based around.
Group winners enter the final phase
Chonburi FC have a bye to the final phase
First phase is played from 1st Feb - 8th Feb
Final phase is played 13th Feb - 22nd Feb
3 foreign sides will enter at the final phase

Qualification rounds
The team finishing first and second in the group stages of the Queens Cup will play a knockout match on Sunday 8 February.
Winner Group A vs. Runner up Group B
Winner Group B  vs. Runner up Group C
Winner Group C vs. Runner up Group D
Winner Group D vs. Runner up Group E
Winner Group E vs. Runner up Group A

The winner will qualify for the final stage of the tournament held in Sirindhorn Stadium, Chonburi.

Fixtures and results

Group stages
Winners and runners up qualify for next round

Group A
Games played at Nongprue Municipality Football Field, Pattaya

Results

Group B
Games played at Ayutthaya Stadium, Ayutthaya

Results

Group C
Games played at Samut Songkhram Stadium, Samut Songkhram

Results

Group D
Games played at Suphanburi Municipality Stadium, Suphanburi

Results

Group E
Games played at Assumption College Sriracha Stadium, Chonburi

Results

Knockout round
5 one-off matches, winners advance to final stage.

Final round: Group stages
Qualifiers:

  Hallelujah FC
  Hanyang University
  Pattaya United
  BEC Tero Sasana
  Chonburi
  Samut Songkhram
  Royal Thai Army
  Krung Thai Bank

Group A
Games played at Princess Sirindhorn Stadium, Chonburi.

Results

Group B
Games played at Princess Sirindhorn Stadium, Chonburi.

Results

Semi-finals

Final

Champions

See also
 Thailand Football Records and Statistics

External links
Thailand Queen's Cup statistics RSSSF
Thai football Blog

2009 in Thai football cups
2009